Bukhuti Zakariadze (Georgian: ბუხუტი ზაქარიაძე, Russified: Бухути Александрович Закариадзе [Bukhuti Alexandrovich Zaqariadze]; 1 July 1913– 12 February 1988) was a Soviet actor and a People's Artist of the Georgian SSR.

Biography
Zakariadze was the younger brother of award-winning Georgian actor Sergo Zakariadze. He made his debut performance on the stage of the Lado Meskhisvili Theater in Kutaisi in 1933. In 1935, he joined the cast of the Akaki Tsereteli Theater in Chiatura, but moved to the Batumi Ilia Chavchavadze Theater two years later. From 1941 to 1945, he worked in the Rustaveli Theatre. After the end of the Second World War, Zakariadze became a regular actor of the Mardzhashvili Georgian Academic Theater in Tbilisi, and from 1948 he performed in the Sukhumi State Theater, named after Samson Chanba. In 1953, he returned to the Rustaveli's stage, where he continued acting until his departure.

Zakariadze first appeared on screen in 1956, in Tengiz Abuladze's short film Magdana's Donkey, which won the Palme d'Or du court métrage in the 1956 Cannes Film Festival. He eventually played in more than thirty films. He was awarded the title Meritorious Artist of the Georgian Soviet Socialist Republic, and in 1965 the distinction People's Artist of the GSSR.

Select filmography
1955 – Magdana's Donkey
1965 – Pierre – a Police Officer
1967 – Vertical
1970 – Liberation
1977 – Wounded Game
1985 – Spring

References

External links

Bukhuti Zakariadze on Kino-Teatr.ru
Bukhuti Zakariadze on geocinema.ge

1913 births
1988 deaths
Actors from Baku
20th-century male actors from Georgia (country)
Soviet male film actors
Soviet male stage actors
People's Artists of Georgia
Male film actors from Georgia (country)
Male stage actors from Georgia (country)